Lieutenant-Colonel Thomas Huxley (died 4 November 1826, Halifax) was a British Army officer. He joined the 87th Foot Regiment in 1799, and was made Captain in the 4th West India Regiment in 1808, and then Captain in the 70th Foot regiment in 1819. When he was part of the 70th Regiment, he married Jessie Scott, the niece of Sir Walter Scott. He later became the Military Secretary to Lord Dalhousie, the Governor General of British North America.  

On 5 November 1819 in Kingston, Ontario, he married Jessie Scott, niece of Sir Walter Scott (daughter of Walter's younger brother Thomas Scott, b. 1774), paymaster of the regiment.  Sir Walter Scott described Huxley as "a very gentleman-like man." 
He became Lt Col. in 1826 and Military Secretary to Lord Dalhousie, the Governor General of Canada.

He committed suicide on 4 November 1826 and was buried in the Old Burying Ground.

References 

History of Nova Scotia
19th-century British Army personnel
18th-century British Army personnel
Shipwreck survivors
West India Regiment officers
East Surrey Regiment officers
British emigrants to Canada
Year of birth missing
1826 deaths
Military personnel who committed suicide
Suicides in Nova Scotia